The President of the Cook County Board of Commissioners is the chief executive of county government in Cook County, Illinois. They are the head of the Cook County Board of Commissioners.

Office description

Officeholders

Recent election results

|-
| colspan=16 style="text-align:center;" |President of the Cook County Board of Commissioners general elections
|-
!Year
!Winning candidate
!Party
!Vote (pct)
!Opponent
!Party
! Vote (pct)
!Opponent
!Party
! Vote (pct)
!Opponent
!Party
! Vote (pct)
|-
|1986
| | George Dunne
| | Democratic
| | 808,126 (60.61%)
| | Joseph D. Matthewson
| | Republican
| | 525,288	(39.39%)
| 
| 
| 
| 
| 
| 
|-
|1990
| | Richard J. Phelan
| | Democratic
| | 714,638 (55.65%)
| | Aldo DeAngelis
| | Republican
| | 405,771	(31.60%)
|Text style="background:#D2B48C | Barbara J. Norman
|Text style="background:#D2B48C | Harold Washington Party
|Text style="background:#D2B48C | 163,817 (12.76%)
| 
| 
| 
|-
|1994
| | John H. Stroger, Jr.
| | Democratic
| | 
| | Joe Morris
| | Republican
| | 
|Text style="background:#D2B48C | Aloysius Majerczyk
|Text style="background:#D2B48C | Harold Washington Party
|Text style="background:#D2B48C | 
| Jerome Carter
| Populist
| 
|-
|1998
| | John H. Stroger, Jr.
| | Democratic
| | 834,972 (63.49%)
| | Aurelia Marie Pucinski
| | Republican
| | 480,191 (36.61%)
| 
| 
| 
| 
| 
| 
|-
|2002
| | John H. Stroger, Jr.
| | Democratic
| | 901,679 (68.73%)
| | Christopher A. Bullock
| | Republican
| | 410,155 (31.27%)
| 
| 
| 
| 
| 
| 
|-
|2006
| | Todd H. Stroger
| | Democratic
| | 690,945 (53.68%)
| | Tony Peraica
| | Republican
| | 596,212 (46.32%)
| 
| 
| 
| 
| 
| 
|-
|2010
| | Toni Preckwinkle
| | Democratic
| | 939,056 (69.54%)
| | Roger A. Keats
| | Republican
| | 357,070 (26.44%)
| | Thomas Tresser
| | Green
| | 54,273 (4.02%)
| 
| 
| 
|-
|2014
| | Toni Preckwinkle
| | Democratic
| | 1,072,886 (100%)
| 
| 
| 
| 
| 
| 
| 
| 
| 
|-
|2018
| | Toni Preckwinkle
| | Democratic
| | 1,355,407 (96.11%)
| Others
| Write-ins
| 54,917 (3.89%)
| 
| 
| 
| 
| 
| 
|-
|2022
| |Toni Preckwinkle
| | Democratic
| |967,062 (68.54%)
| |Bob Fioretti
| | Republican
| |399,339 (28.30%)
| |Thea Tsatsos
| | Libertarian
| |44,615 (3.16%)
| 
| 
|

References

 
1876 establishments in Illinois